Eupogonius vandykei is a species of beetle in the family Cerambycidae. It was described by Linsley in 1935. It is known from Mexico.

References

Eupogonius
Beetles described in 1935